Rafi Amit, is an Israeli professional poker player, from Holon.

Amit has won two bracelets at the World Series of Poker, the first in the 2005 Pot limit Omaha event and the second in 2007 in the $1,000 Deuce to Seven Triple Draw Lowball with rebuys event.

As of 2009, his total live tournament winnings exceed $940,000. His eight cashes at the WSOP account for $941,988 of those winnings.

World Series of Poker Bracelets

References

External links 
 LaunchPoker.com report on Rafi Amit in 2005

Living people
Israeli poker players
World Series of Poker bracelet winners
People from Holon
Year of birth missing (living people)